Saint-Just is a former commune in the Eure department of northern France. On 1 January 2017, it was merged into the new commune La Chapelle-Longueville.

Population

See also
Communes of the Eure department

References

Former communes of Eure